A syllogism (syllogismos, 'conclusion, inference') is a kind of logical argument that applies deductive reasoning to arrive at a conclusion based on two propositions that are asserted or assumed to be true.

In its earliest form (defined by Aristotle in his 350 BC book Prior Analytics), a syllogism arises when two true premises (propositions or statements) validly imply a conclusion, or the main point that the argument aims to get across. For example, knowing that all men are mortal (major premise) and that Socrates is a man (minor premise), we may validly conclude that Socrates is mortal. Syllogistic arguments are usually represented in a three-line form: 
	
All men are mortal.
Socrates is a man.
Therefore, Socrates is mortal.In antiquity, two rival syllogistic theories existed: Aristotelian syllogism and Stoic syllogism. From the Middle Ages onwards, categorical syllogism and syllogism were usually used interchangeably. This article is concerned only with this historical use. The syllogism was at the core of historical deductive reasoning, whereby facts are determined by combining existing statements, in contrast to inductive reasoning in which facts are determined by repeated observations.

Within some academic contexts, syllogism has been superseded by first-order predicate logic following the work of Gottlob Frege, in particular his Begriffsschrift (Concept Script; 1879). Syllogism, being a method of valid logical reasoning, will always be useful in most circumstances and for general-audience introductions to logic and clear-thinking.

Early history

In antiquity, two rival syllogistic theories existed: Aristotelian syllogism and Stoic syllogism.

Aristotle

Aristotle defines the syllogism as "a discourse in which certain (specific) things having been supposed, something different from the things supposed results of necessity because these things are so." Despite this very general definition, in Prior Analytics, Aristotle limits himself to categorical syllogisms that consist of three categorical propositions, including categorical modal syllogisms.

The use of syllogisms as a tool for understanding can be dated back to the logical reasoning discussions of Aristotle. Before the mid-12th century, medieval logicians were only familiar with a portion of Aristotle's works, including such titles as Categories and On Interpretation, works that contributed heavily to the prevailing Old Logic, or logica vetus. The onset of a New Logic, or logica nova, arose alongside the reappearance of Prior Analytics, the work in which Aristotle developed his theory of the syllogism.

Prior Analytics, upon rediscovery, was instantly regarded by logicians as "a closed and complete body of doctrine," leaving very little for thinkers of the day to debate and reorganize. Aristotle's theory on the syllogism for assertoric sentences was considered especially remarkable, with only small systematic changes occurring to the concept over time. This theory of the syllogism would not enter the context of the more comprehensive logic of consequence until logic began to be reworked in general in the mid-14th century by the likes of John Buridan.

Aristotle's Prior Analytics did not, however, incorporate such a comprehensive theory on the modal syllogism—a syllogism that has at least one modalized premise, that is, a premise containing the modal words 'necessarily', 'possibly', or 'contingently'. Aristotle's terminology, in this aspect of his theory, was deemed vague and in many cases unclear, even contradicting some of his statements from On Interpretation. His original assertions on this specific component of the theory were left up to a considerable amount of conversation, resulting in a wide array of solutions put forth by commentators of the day. The system for modal syllogisms laid forth by Aristotle would ultimately be deemed unfit for practical use and would be replaced by new distinctions and new theories altogether.

Medieval syllogism

Boethius

Boethius (c. 475–526) contributed an effort to make the ancient Aristotelian logic more accessible. While his Latin translation of Prior Analytics went primarily unused before the 12th century, his textbooks on the categorical syllogism were central to expanding the syllogistic discussion. Rather than in any additions that he personally made to the field, Boethius's logical legacy lies in his effective transmission of prior theories to later logicians, as well as his clear and primarily accurate presentations of Aristotle's contributions.

Peter Abelard

Another of medieval logic's first contributors from the Latin West, Peter Abelard (1079–1142), gave his own thorough evaluation of the syllogism concept and accompanying theory in the Dialectica—a discussion of logic based on Boethius's commentaries and monographs. His perspective on syllogisms can be found in other works as well, such as Logica Ingredientibus. With the help of Abelard's distinction between de dicto modal sentences and de re modal sentences, medieval logicians began to shape a more coherent concept of Aristotle's modal syllogism model.

Jean Buridan

The French philosopher Jean Buridan (c. 1300 – 1361), whom some consider the foremost logician of the later Middle Ages, contributed two significant works: Treatise on Consequence and Summulae de Dialectica, in which he discussed the concept of the syllogism, its components and distinctions, and ways to use the tool to expand its logical capability. For 200 years after Buridan's discussions, little was said about syllogistic logic. Historians of logic have assessed that the primary changes in the post-Middle Age era were changes in respect to the public's awareness of original sources, a lessening of appreciation for the logic's sophistication and complexity, and an increase in logical ignorance—so that logicians of the early 20th century came to view the whole system as ridiculous.

Modern history

The Aristotelian syllogism dominated Western philosophical thought for many centuries. Syllogism itself is about drawing valid conclusions from assumptions (axioms), rather than about verifying the assumptions. However, people over time focused on the logic aspect, forgetting the importance of verifying the assumptions.

In the 17th century, Francis Bacon emphasized that experimental verification of axioms must be carried out rigorously, and cannot take syllogism itself as the best way to draw conclusions in nature. Bacon proposed a more inductive approach to the observation of nature, which involves experimentation and leads to discovering and building on axioms to create a more general conclusion. Yet, a full method of drawing conclusions in nature is not the scope of logic or syllogism, and the inductive method was covered in Aristotle's subsequent treatise, the Posterior Analytics.

In the 19th century, modifications to syllogism were incorporated to deal with disjunctive ("A or B") and conditional ("if A then B") statements. Immanuel Kant famously claimed, in Logic (1800), that logic was the one completed science, and that Aristotelian logic more or less included everything about logic that there was to know. (This work is not necessarily representative of Kant's mature philosophy, which is often regarded as an innovation to logic itself.) Although there were alternative systems of logic elsewhere, such as Avicennian logic or Indian logic, Kant's opinion stood unchallenged in the West until 1879, when Gottlob Frege published his Begriffsschrift (Concept Script). This introduced a calculus, a method of representing categorical statements (and statements that are not provided for in syllogism as well) by the use of quantifiers and variables.

A noteworthy exception is the logic developed in Bernard Bolzano's work Wissenschaftslehre (Theory of Science, 1837), the principles of which were applied as a direct critique of Kant, in the posthumously published work New Anti-Kant (1850). The work of Bolzano had been largely overlooked until the late 20th century, among other reasons, because of the intellectual environment at the time in Bohemia, which was then part of the Austrian Empire. In the last 20 years, Bolzano's work has resurfaced and become subject of both translation and contemporary study.

This led to the rapid development of sentential logic and first-order predicate logic, subsuming syllogistic reasoning, which was, therefore, after 2000 years, suddenly considered obsolete by many. The Aristotelian system is explicated in modern fora of academia primarily in introductory material and historical study.

One notable exception to this modern relegation is the continued application of Aristotelian logic by officials of the Congregation for the Doctrine of the Faith, and the Apostolic Tribunal of the Roman Rota, which still requires that any arguments crafted by Advocates be presented in syllogistic format.

Boole's acceptance of Aristotle
George Boole's unwavering acceptance of Aristotle's logic is emphasized by the historian of logic John Corcoran in an accessible introduction to Laws of Thought. Corcoran also wrote a point-by-point comparison of Prior Analytics and Laws of Thought. According to Corcoran, Boole fully accepted and endorsed Aristotle's logic. Boole's goals were "to go under, over, and beyond" Aristotle's logic by:

 providing it with mathematical foundations involving equations;
 extending the class of problems it could treat, as solving equations was added to assessing validity; and
 expanding the range of applications it could handle, such as expanding propositions of only two terms to those having arbitrarily many.

More specifically, Boole agreed with what Aristotle said; Boole's 'disagreements', if they might be called that, concern what Aristotle did not say. First, in the realm of foundations, Boole reduced Aristotle's four propositional forms to one form, the form of equations, which by itself was a revolutionary idea. Second, in the realm of logic's problems, Boole's addition of equation solving to logic—another revolutionary idea—involved Boole's doctrine that Aristotle's rules of inference (the "perfect syllogisms") must be supplemented by rules for equation solving. Third, in the realm of applications, Boole's system could handle multi-term propositions and arguments, whereas Aristotle could handle only two-termed subject-predicate propositions and arguments. For example, Aristotle's system could not deduce: "No quadrangle that is a square is a rectangle that is a rhombus" from "No square that is a quadrangle is a rhombus that is a rectangle" or from "No rhombus that is a rectangle is a square that is a quadrangle."

Basic structure
A categorical syllogism consists of three parts:
 Major premise
 Minor premise
 Conclusion

Each part is a categorical proposition, and each categorical proposition contains two categorical terms. In Aristotle, each of the premises is in the form "All A are B," "Some A are B", "No A are B" or "Some A are not B", where "A" is one term and "B" is another:

 "All A are B," and "No A are B" are termed universal propositions;
 "Some A are B" and "Some A are not B" are termed particular propositions.

More modern logicians allow some variation. Each of the premises has one term in common with the conclusion: in a major premise, this is the major term (i.e., the predicate of the conclusion); in a minor premise, this is the minor term (i.e., the subject of the conclusion). For example:

Major premise: All humans are mortal.
Minor premise: All Greeks are humans.
Conclusion: All Greeks are mortal.

Each of the three distinct terms represents a category. From the example above, humans, mortal, and Greeks: mortal is the major term, and Greeks the minor term. The premises also have one term in common with each other, which is known as the middle term; in this example, humans. Both of the premises are universal, as is the conclusion.

Major premise: All mortals die.
Minor premise: All men are mortals.
Conclusion: All men die.

Here, the major term is die, the minor term is men, and the middle term is mortals. Again, both premises are universal, hence so is the conclusion.

Polysyllogism 

A polysyllogism, or a sorites, is a form of argument in which a series of incomplete syllogisms is so arranged that the predicate of each premise forms the subject of the next until the subject of the first is joined with the predicate of the last in the conclusion. For example, one might argue that all lions are big cats, all big cats are predators, and all predators are carnivores. To conclude that therefore all lions are carnivores is to construct a sorites argument.

Types

There are infinitely many possible syllogisms, but only 256 logically distinct types and only 24 valid types (enumerated below). A syllogism takes the form (note: M – Middle, S – subject, P – predicate.):

Major premise: All M are P.
Minor premise: All S are M.
Conclusion: All S are P.

The premises and conclusion of a syllogism can be any of four types, which are labeled by letters as follows. The meaning of the letters is given by the table:

In Prior Analytics, Aristotle uses mostly the letters A, B, and C (Greek letters alpha, beta, and gamma) as term place holders, rather than giving concrete examples. It is traditional to use is rather than are as the copula, hence All A is B rather than All As are Bs. It is traditional and convenient practice to use a, e, i, o as infix operators so the categorical statements can be written succinctly. The following table shows the longer form, the succinct shorthand, and equivalent expressions in predicate logic:

The convention here is that the letter S is the subject of the conclusion, P is the predicate of the conclusion, and M is the middle term.  The major premise links M with P and the minor premise links M with S.  However, the middle term can be either the subject or the predicate of each premise where it appears.  The differing positions of the major, minor, and middle terms gives rise to another classification of syllogisms known as the figure.  Given that in each case the conclusion is S-P, the four figures are:

(Note, however, that, following Aristotle's treatment of the figures, some logicians—e.g., Peter Abelard and Jean Buridan—reject the fourth figure as a figure distinct from the first.)

Putting it all together, there are 256 possible types of syllogisms (or 512 if the order of the major and minor premises is changed, though this makes no difference logically). Each premise and the conclusion can be of type A, E, I or O, and the syllogism can be any of the four figures.  A syllogism can be described briefly by giving the letters for the premises and conclusion followed by the number for the figure.  For example, the syllogism BARBARA below is AAA-1, or "A-A-A in the first figure".

The vast majority of the 256 possible forms of syllogism are invalid (the conclusion does not follow logically from the premises).  The table below shows the valid forms. Even some of these are sometimes considered to commit the existential fallacy, meaning they are invalid if they mention an empty category. These controversial patterns are marked in italics. All but four of the patterns in italics (felapton, darapti, fesapo and bamalip) are weakened moods, i.e. it is possible to draw a stronger conclusion from the premises.

Fig. 1, treble clef. "A syllogism's letters can be best represented in music— take E, for example." -Marilyn Damord

The letters A, E, I, and O have been used since the medieval Schools to form mnemonic names for the forms as follows: 'Barbara' stands for AAA, 'Celarent' for EAE, etc.

Next to each premise and conclusion is a shorthand description of the sentence.  So in AAI-3, the premise "All squares are rectangles" becomes "MaP"; the symbols mean that the first term ("square") is the middle term, the second term ("rectangle") is the predicate of the conclusion, and the relationship between the two terms is labeled "a" (All M are P).

The following table shows all syllogisms that are essentially different. The similar syllogisms share the same premises, just written in a different way. For example "Some pets are kittens" (SiM in Darii) could also be written as "Some kittens are pets" (MiS in Datisi).

In the Venn diagrams, the black areas indicate no elements, and the red areas indicate at least one element.  In the predicate logic expressions, a horizontal bar over an expression means to negate ("logical not") the result of that expression.

It is also possible to use graphs (consisting of vertices and edges) to evaluate syllogisms.

Examples

Barbara (AAA-1)

Celarent (EAE-1)
Similar: Cesare (EAE-2)

Darii (AII-1)
Similar: Datisi (AII-3)

Ferio (EIO-1)
Similar: Festino (EIO-2), Ferison (EIO-3), Fresison (EIO-4)

Baroco (AOO-2)

Bocardo (OAO-3)

Barbari (AAI-1)

Celaront (EAO-1)
Similar: Cesaro (EAO-2)

Camestros (AEO-2)
Similar: Calemos (AEO-4)

Felapton (EAO-3)
Similar: Fesapo (EAO-4)

Darapti (AAI-3)

Table of all syllogisms
This table shows all 24 valid syllogisms, represented by Venn diagrams. Columns indicate similarity, and are grouped by combinations of premises. Borders correspond to conclusions. Those with an existential assumption are dashed.

Terms in syllogism

With Aristotle, we may distinguish singular terms, such as Socrates, and general terms, such as Greeks. Aristotle further distinguished types (a) and (b):

Such a predication is known as a distributive, as opposed to non-distributive as in Greeks are numerous. It is clear that Aristotle's syllogism works only for distributive predication, since we cannot reason All Greeks are animals, animals are numerous, therefore all Greeks are numerous. In Aristotle's view singular terms were of type (a), and general terms of type (b). Thus, Men can be predicated of Socrates but Socrates cannot be predicated of anything. Therefore, for a term to be interchangeable—to be either in the subject or predicate position of a proposition in a syllogism—the terms must be general terms, or categorical terms as they came to be called. Consequently, the propositions of a syllogism should be categorical propositions (both terms general) and syllogisms that employ only categorical terms came to be called categorical syllogisms.

It is clear that nothing would prevent a singular term occurring in a syllogism—so long as it was always in the subject position—however, such a syllogism, even if valid, is not a categorical syllogism. An example is Socrates is a man, all men are mortal, therefore Socrates is mortal. Intuitively this is as valid as All Greeks are men, all men are mortal therefore all Greeks are mortals. To argue that its validity can be explained by the theory of syllogism would require that we show that Socrates is a man is the equivalent of a categorical proposition.  It can be argued Socrates is a man is equivalent to All that are identical to Socrates are men, so our non-categorical syllogism can be justified by use of the equivalence above and then citing BARBARA.

Existential import

If a statement includes a term such that the statement is false if the term has no instances, then the statement is said to have existential import with respect to that term. It is ambiguous whether or not a universal statement of the form All A is B is to be considered as true, false, or even meaningless if there are no As. If it is considered as false in such cases, then the statement All A is B has existential import with respect to A.

It is claimed Aristotle's logic system does not cover cases where there are no instances.
Aristotle's goal was to develop "a companion-logic for science.
He relegates fictions, such as mermaids and unicorns, to
the realms of poetry and literature. In his mind, they exist outside the
ambit of science, which is why he leaves no room for such non-existent
entities in his logic.  This is a thoughtful choice, not an inadvertent
omission. Technically, Aristotelian science is a search for definitions,
where a definition is 'a phrase signifying a thing's essence.'...
Because non-existent entities cannot be anything, they do not, in
Aristotle's mind, possess an essence...  This is why he leaves
no place for fictional entities like goat-stags (or unicorns)."

However, many logic systems developed since do consider the case where there may be no instances. Medieval logicians were aware of the problem of existential import and maintained that negative propositions do not carry existential import, and that positive propositions with subjects that do not supposit are false.

The following problems arise:

For example, if it is accepted that AiB is false if there are no As and AaB entails AiB, then AiB has existential import with respect to A, and so does AaB. Further, if it is accepted that AiB entails BiA, then AiB and AaB have existential import with respect to B as well. Similarly, if AoB is false if there are no As, and AeB entails AoB, and AeB entails BeA (which in turn entails BoA) then both AeB and AoB have existential import with respect to both A and B. It follows immediately that all universal categorical statements have existential import with respect to both terms. If AaB and AeB is a fair representation of the use of statements in normal natural language of All A is B and No A is B respectively, then the following example consequences arise:

"All flying horses are mythical" is false if there are no flying horses.

If "No men are fire-eating rabbits" is true, then "There are fire-eating rabbits" is true; and so on.

If it is ruled that no universal statement has existential import then the square of opposition fails in several respects (e.g. AaB does not entail AiB) and a number of syllogisms are no longer valid (e.g. BaC,AaB->AiC).

These problems and paradoxes arise in both natural language statements and statements in syllogism form because of ambiguity, in particular ambiguity with respect to All. If "Fred claims all his books were Pulitzer Prize winners", is Fred claiming that he wrote any books? If not, then is what he claims true? Suppose Jane says none of her friends are poor; is that true if she has no friends?

The first-order predicate calculus avoids such ambiguity by using formulae that carry no existential import with respect to universal statements. Existential claims must be explicitly stated. Thus, natural language statements—of the forms All A is B, No A is B, Some A is B, and Some A is not B—can be represented in first order predicate calculus in which any existential import with respect to terms A and/or B is either explicit or not made at all. Consequently, the four forms AaB, AeB, AiB, and AoB can be represented in first order predicate in every combination of existential import—so it can establish which construal, if any, preserves the square of opposition and the validity of the traditionally valid syllogism. Strawson claims such a construal is possible, but the results are such that, in his view, the answer to question (e) above is no.

Syllogistic fallacies

People often make mistakes when reasoning syllogistically.

For instance, from the premises some A are B, some B are C, people tend to come to a definitive conclusion that therefore some A are C. However, this does not follow according to the rules of classical logic. For instance, while some cats (A) are black things (B), and some black things (B) are televisions (C), it does not follow from the parameters that some cats (A) are televisions (C). This is because in the structure of the syllogism invoked (i.e. III-1) the middle term is not distributed in either the major premise or in the minor premise, a pattern called the "fallacy of the undistributed middle". Because of this, it can be hard to follow formal logic, and a closer eye is needed in order to ensure that an argument is, in fact, valid.

Determining the validity of a syllogism involves determining the distribution of each term in each statement, meaning whether all members of that term are accounted for.

In simple syllogistic patterns, the fallacies of invalid patterns are:

Undistributed middle: Neither of the premises accounts for all members of the middle term, which consequently fails to link the major and minor term.
Illicit treatment of the major term: The conclusion implicates all members of the major term (P – meaning the proposition is negative); however, the major premise does not account for them all (i.e., P is either an affirmative predicate or a particular subject there).
Illicit treatment of the minor term: Same as above, but for the minor term (S – meaning the proposition is universal) and minor premise (where S is either a particular subject or an affirmative predicate).
Exclusive premises: Both premises are negative, meaning no link is established between the major and minor terms.
Affirmative conclusion from a negative premise: If either premise is negative, the conclusion must also be.
Negative conclusion from affirmative premises: If both premises are affirmative, the conclusion must also be.

Other types of syllogism 

Disjunctive syllogism
Hypothetical syllogism
Legal syllogism
Polysyllogism
Prosleptic syllogism
Quasi-syllogism
Statistical syllogism

See also

Syllogistic fallacy
 Argumentation theory
 Buddhist logic
 Enthymeme
 Formal fallacy
 Logical fallacy
 The False Subtlety of the Four Syllogistic Figures
 Tautology (logic)
 Venn diagram

References

Sources
Aristotle, [c. 350 BCE] 1989. Prior Analytics, translated by R. Smith. Hackett. 
Blackburn, Simon. [1994] 1996. "Syllogism." In The Oxford Dictionary of Philosophy. Oxford University Press. .
 Broadie, Alexander. 1993. Introduction to Medieval Logic. Oxford University Press. .
Copi, Irving. 1969. Introduction to Logic (3rd ed.). Macmillan Company.
Corcoran, John. 1972. "Completeness of an ancient logic." Journal of Symbolic Logic 37:696–702.
 — 1994. "The founding of logic: Modern interpretations of Aristotle's logic." Ancient Philosophy 14:9–24.
 Corcoran, John, and Hassan Masoud. 2015. "Existential Import Today: New Metatheorems; Historical, Philosophical, and Pedagogical Misconceptions." History and Philosophy of Logic 36(1):39–61.
 Englebretsen, George. 1987. The New Syllogistic. Bern: Peter Lang.
Hamblin, Charles Leonard. 1970. Fallacies. London: Methuen. . 
Cf. on validity of syllogisms: "A simple set of rules of validity was finally produced in the later Middle Ages, based on the concept of Distribution."
Łukasiewicz, Jan. [1957] 1987. Aristotle's Syllogistic from the Standpoint of Modern Formal Logic. New York: Garland Publishers. . .
 Malink, Marko. 2013. Aristotle's Modal Syllogistic. Cambridge, MA: Harvard University Press.
 Patzig, Günter. 1968. Aristotle's theory of the syllogism: a logico-philological study of Book A of the Prior Analytics. Dordrecht: Reidel.
 Rescher, Nicholas. 1966. Galen and the Syllogism. University of Pittsburgh Press. .
 Smiley, Timothy. 1973. "What is a syllogism?" Journal of Philosophical Logic 2:136–54.
 Smith, Robin. 1986. "Immediate propositions and Aristotle's proof theory." Ancient Philosophy 6:47–68.
 Thom, Paul. 1981. "The Syllogism." Philosophia. München. .

External links
 
 Koutsoukou-Argyraki, Angeliki. Aristotle's Assertoric Syllogistic (Formal proof development in Isabelle/HOL, Archive of Formal Proofs)
 
 Aristotle's Prior Analytics: the Theory of Categorical Syllogism an annotated bibliography on Aristotle's syllogistic
 Fuzzy Syllogistic System
 Development of Fuzzy Syllogistic Algorithms and Applications Distributed Reasoning Approaches
 Comparison between the Aristotelian Syllogism and the Indian/Tibetan Syllogism
 The Buddhist Philosophy of Universal Flux (Chapter XXIII – Members of a Syllogism (avayava))
  Online Syllogistic Machine An interactive syllogistic machine for exploring all the fallacies, figures, terms, and modes of syllogisms.

 
Term logic
Arguments